James Shaw Thomson (born 1 October 1946) is a Scottish former professional footballer who played as a defender for Chelsea from 1965 to 1968 before subsequently moving to Burnley until retiring in 1981.

References

1946 births
Living people
Footballers from Glasgow
Scottish footballers
Association football defenders
Chelsea F.C. players
Burnley F.C. players
English Football League players